Alexandra M. Hunt (born 1992 or 1993) is an American political candidate, public health worker, and activist from Pennsylvania. She is a member of the Democratic Party. Hunt has run to represent  in the United States House of Representatives and is a candidate for city controller of Philadelphia.

Early life and career
Hunt is from Rochester, New York, where she grew up in the inner city. She attended public schools in the suburbs, where both of her parents worked as teachers. Hunt attended the University of Richmond; she paid her way through school by working as a server and a stripper. She completed her Bachelor of Science in psychology in 2014.

After graduating from Richmond, Hunt moved to Philadelphia, where she earned a Master of Science in interdisciplinary health sciences at Drexel University and a Master of Public Health from Temple University. She worked at the Fox Chase Cancer Center in the clinical research department when the COVID-19 pandemic began and volunteered in the community at COVID-19 testing sites and distributing food and other necessities.

Political career

Running as a progressive, Hunt supported the Green New Deal, Medicare for All, forgiving student loan debt, and repealing FOSTA-SESTA. During the campaign, she opened an OnlyFans account in response to an Internet troll who said he was looking forward to her setting up an account after she loses, saying that she did so to lessen the stigma around sex work. She used the account to raise funds for her campaign. Hunt lost the nomination to Evans, receiving 18% of the vote while Evans received 78%.

Following Rebecca Rhynhart's resignation as Philadelphia city controller in order to run for mayor of Philadelphia, Hunt declared her candidacy in the 2023 special election to fill the position.

Personal life
Hunt has coached youth soccer, but was asked to leave her position when parents found out about her past sex work. She had an abortion when she was 18 years old and survived domestic violence and two sexual assaults.

References

Living people
People from Rochester, New York
University of Richmond alumni
Drexel University alumni
Temple University alumni
Pennsylvania Democrats
American female erotic dancers
Women in Pennsylvania politics
Year of birth missing (living people)
Candidates in the 2022 United States House of Representatives elections
21st-century American women politicians
OnlyFans creators